Ben Rubin or Benjamin Rubin may refer to:

Ben Rubin (legislator) (1886–1942), Wisconsin Socialist and Progressive state legislator from Milwaukee
Ben Rubin (Magic: The Gathering player), American Magic: The Gathering player
Ben Rubin (Entrepreneur) (1988—), Co-founder of Meerkat
Benjamin Rubin (1917–2010), microbiologist and inventor of the bifurcated vaccination needle for smallpox
Ben Rubin (artist) (1964–), media artist and designer based in New York City